Urdă (indefinite form urdhë; ; ; ;) is a sort of whey cheese commonly produced in Southeast Europe.

Etymology
The name derives from Albanian urdhë/urdha, from Proto-Albanian *wurdā, from an earlier form *urdā or *uordā, ultimately derived from Proto-Indo-European *uer- "to boil, to burn". It is cognate to Old Armenian վառիմ (vaṙim, "to burn"), Lithuanian vìrti ("to cook, to boil"). It is semantically relevant that this cheese is produced by boiling whey. The Albanian term urdhë/urdha has been borrowed to other Balkan and Carpathian languages, notably Romanian urdă, but also Bulgarian, Hungarian, Serbo-Croatian, Slovak, Rusyn, Polish, Czech, and Russian languages.

Production
Urda is made from whey of sheep, goat or cow milk. Urdă is produced by heating the whey resulting from the draining of any type of cheese. It is often made into molds to the shape of a half sphere. The paste is finely grained, silky and palatable. It contains 18 grams of protein per 100 grams.

Urdă is similar to ricotta in the way it is produced.

Common uses
In Romania, urdă is traditionally used in the preparation of several desserts, such as clătită and plăcintă. Urda is also traditionally prepared in Serbia, notably in the southern region of Pirot.

See also
 List of cheeses

References

Whey cheeses
Albanian cheeses
Romanian cheeses
Serbian cheeses
Ukrainian cheeses
Hungarian cheeses
Macedonian cuisine
Bulgarian cheeses
Macedonian cheeses